Hattie B's Hot Chicken is an American restaurant chain based in Nashville, Tennessee, founded by a father and son, each named Nick Bishop. The company specializes in hot chicken, a fried chicken dish, and operates several restaurants in the Southern United States.

Overview
The restaurant is named after three women in the Bishop family with the name Hattie. The company purveys hot chicken, a local specialty and signature dish of Nashville, chicken and waffles, side dishes, desserts and other foods. The chicken is provided at various spice levels. The spiciest version of the hot chicken has been described as having a very marked, severe spiciness, and is prepared using ghost peppers as an ingredient. The chicken is served with pickles and atop white bread, as per traditional local preparation methods.

The original Hattie B's Hot Chicken opened in Midtown Nashville on August 9, 2012. A second location opened in June 2014 in West Nashville, a location in Birmingham, Alabama, opened in June 2016, and a third Nashville location opened in November 2017. A new location was opened in Midtown Memphis in April 2018. An Atlanta, Georgia, location opened in July 2018. In the fall of 2018, a location opened inside The Cosmopolitan in Las Vegas, Nevada. Their newest location was opened in Dallas, Texas, in February 2022.  It is a privately held, family-owned company.

Reception
Columnists in USA Today and Sports Illustrated reviewed the restaurant in 2017. In 2017, it was ranked sixth on The Daily Meal's list of America's 75 Best Fried Chicken Spots.

See also
 List of chicken restaurants
 List of companies based in Nashville, Tennessee

References

External links
 

Companies based in Nashville, Tennessee
Regional restaurant chains in the United States
Restaurants established in 2012
Restaurants in Nashville, Tennessee
Restaurants in Birmingham, Alabama
2012 establishments in Tennessee
Chicken chains of the United States
Restaurant chains
2012 establishments in the United States